Reginald Jones (born December 30, 1953) was an American track and field athlete. He is best known for recording a time in 1975 that equalled the then world record in the 100 meter dash and being a member of teams that in 1976 equalled the world records for the 4x220 y and 4 × 200 m relays.

Track career 

Jones ran for the University of Tennessee track team. During his time there he was NCAA champion in the 100 yards event in 1974 and the 220 yards event in 1975, helping the team to an NCAA championship. In addition, in 1974 he was voted the most valuable performer.

Later in 1974, Jones ran for the US in the  USA vs USSR track meet and won the 200m m beating the then Olympic Champion Valeriy Borzov who was running for the Soviet Union and beat his more famous compatriot, Steve Williams to victory in the 100 m.
On July 26, 1975, running in Boston, Jones won the 100 m event recording a time of 9.9 that equalled the then world record. The time was never forwarded for ratification because all the timings at the meeting were considered suspect.

Early in 1976, Jones ran the anchor legs of University of Tennessee team that equalled the world records for the 4x220 y and 4 × 200 m events. The former occurred on April 10 in Knoxville were the team ran 1.21.7 for 4x220 y; the latter occurred on April 24 in Philadelphia where the team ran 1.21.5 for the 4 × 200 m at the Penn Relays.

In 1976, Jones attempted to qualify for the Olympic Games but the reoccurrence of an old football injury meant he could only finish 7th in 100 m final and never got out of his semi in the 200 m. This injury was to prematurely end his track career.

Accolades and awards 

Jones has been inducted into the Saginaw County Sports Hall of Fame.

In 1998, Jones was inducted into the Penn Relay Hall of Fame for his exploits in 1976, and in 2006 the 1976 University of Tennessee world-record breaking team he was a member of was also inducted.

Personal life
A native of Saginaw, Michigan, Jones is reported to have worked as a teacher in Memphis, Tennessee after college.

Track and field rankings
Jones was ranked among the best in the US and the world in the 100 yard/100 metre and 200 yard/200 metre sprint events  in the period 1974–76, according to the votes of the experts of Track and Field News.

References

External links

1953 births
American male sprinters
World record setters in athletics (track and field)
Living people